Port Alexander (Lingít: Shee Yat’aḵ.aan) is a city at the southeastern corner of Baranof Island in Prince of Wales-Hyder Census Area, Alaska, United States. At the 2010 census the population was 52, down from 81 in 2000.

History
Port Alexander once was a bustling city with as many as 2,500 people in the early 20th century, Prior to the 1920s, Port Alexander was the salmon fishing capital of the world.

Port Alexander originally incorporated in 1936.  It became a part of the Greater Sitka Borough in 1963, following the state legislature's passage of the Mandatory Borough Act.  The original municipality was dissolved when it unified with Sitka's city and borough governments in 1971, which formed the present-day entity known as the City and Borough of Sitka.  However, residents were independent and desired to govern themselves so they successfully sought to detach themselves from the new municipality.  Port Alexander reincorporated as a second class city in 1974.

The Port Alexander Historical Society successfully completed the project of creating a small museum celebrating the town's history in the 2000s.

Geography
Port Alexander is located at  (56.239871, -134.657177).

Port Alexander is the only city on a small sliver of land at the southeastern corner of Baranof Island that is not part of the City and Borough of Sitka. It comprises less than one-quarter of one percent of Baranof Island's land area.

The city is served by the Baranautica Air Service with seasonal Essential Air Service flights and the EYAK brings supplies and mail weekly. Port Alexander Seaplane Base.

Climate
Despite its latitude at 56°14'N Port Alexander has an oceanic climate (Köppen climate classification: Cfb ) with cool, wet (In Port Alexander's case snowy) winters, and mild, dry summers.

Demographics

Port Alexander first reported on the 1930 U.S. Census as an unincorporated village. It formally incorporated in 1936. It merged with the City of Sitka in 1971, but detached itself and reincorporated in 1974. Port Alexander is a second-class city.

As of the census of 2000, there were 81 people, 34 households, and 19 families residing in the city. The population density was 21.5 people per square mile (8.3/km2). There were 79 housing units at an average density of 20.9 per square mile (8.1/km2). The racial makeup of the city was 83.95% White, 4.94% Native American, and 11.11% from two or more races. 4.94% of the population were Hispanic or Latino of any race.

There were 34 households, out of which 29.4% had children under the age of 18 living with them, 58.8% were married couples living together, and 41.2% were non-families. 38.2% of all households were made up of individuals, and 5.9% had someone living alone who was 65 years of age or older. The average household size was 2.38 and the average family size was 3.30.

In the city, the age distribution of the population shows 30.9% under the age of 18, 3.7% from 18 to 24, 29.6% from 25 to 44, 33.3% from 45 to 64, and 2.5% who were 65 years of age or older. The median age was 38 years. For every 100 females, there were 113.2 males. For every 100 females age 18 and over, there were 115.4 males.

The median income for a household in the city was $31,563, and the median income for a family was $31,875. Males had a median income of $51,250 versus $41,250 for females. The per capita income for the city was $14,767. There were 25.0% of families and 22.9% of the population living below the poverty line, including 18.5% of under eighteens and none of those over 64.

Education
The school is the Port Alexander School, operated by Southeast Island School District. The students created this video in 2019: https://www.youtube.com/watch?v=hLTIJ7rN-uY&t=66s

References

External links

Cities in Alaska
Cities in Prince of Wales–Hyder Census Area, Alaska
Populated coastal places in Alaska on the Pacific Ocean